A cereal coffee (also known as grain coffee, roasted grain drink or roasted grain beverage) is a hot drink made from one or more cereal grains roasted and commercially processed into crystal or powder form to be reconstituted later in hot water. The product is often marketed as a caffeine-free alternative to coffee and tea, or in other cases where those drinks are scarce or expensive.

Several well-known cereal coffee brands are Nestlé Caro, Postum, and Inka. Other brands can be found at health food stores and at some grocery stores. Some common ingredients include toasted barley, malted barley, rye, chicory, molasses, and beet root.

Use

Asia
Cereal coffee is popular in East Asian cuisines—Korea, Japan, and China each having one or more versions (usually roasted grains simply steeped in hot water).
 Barley tea (bori-cha, dàmài-chá, mugi-cha)
 Rice tea
 Brown rice tea (hyeonmi-cha, nước gạo lứt)
 Sungnyung
 Corn tea (oksusu-cha)
 Job's tears tea (yulmu-cha)

Grain-like seeds and pseudocereals are used to make similar drinks.
 Buckwheat tea (memil-cha, soba-cha)
 Sicklepod tea (gyeolmyeongja-cha)

Grain teas can also be blended with green tea or other tea drinks.
 Brown rice green tea (hyeonmi-nokcha)
 Genmaicha

Europe
Some notable Polish brands which specialize in cereal coffee are Inka, Krakus and Anatol.

In Czech Republic, a Kávoviny Melta brand has been roasting grain coffee since 1896.

Such roasted grain mixes are also used as a base to make podpiwek, a type of non-alcoholic beverage.

See also

 Coffee substitute
 Grain milk
 List of barley-based drinks
 Mash ingredients

References

Coffee substitutes
Imitation foods
Cereals